7085 aluminum alloy is wrought type alloy. It has very high zinc percentage. It also contains magnesium and copper.

Chemical composition

Applications 
 Thick plate
 Aerospace industry

References 

Aluminium–zinc alloys